Michael Ryan Gottfredson (born January 16, 1951) is the former President of the University of Oregon, serving from August 1, 2012 to August 6, 2014.

Biography
He has a B.A from the University of California, Davis, a M.A. and a Ph.D. from the State University of New York at Albany.
 
He previously served as provost and executive vice-chancellor of University of California, Irvine.

On June 11, 2012, it was announced that he was the sole finalist for the position of president at the University of Oregon. He was confirmed by the Oregon State Board of Higher Education on June 15, 2012, with the decision to take effect on August 1, 2012.

As the President of the University of Oregon, Gottfredson was a member of the Board of Trustees of the University of Oregon. On August 6, 2014, Gottfredson announced, via a campus-wide email, his decision to depart the University of Oregon to pursue other scholarly interests and spend more time with family. The UO Board of Trustees formally accepted Gottfredson's resignation and appointed Scott Coltrane as interim president the following day.

As of late 2014, Gottfredson is a research professor of Criminology, Law & Society at University of California, Irvine. He held various  positions at the University of Arizona from 1985 to 2000, and has been before associate professor at The Claremont Graduate School, Claremont, California (1983-1985), associate professor of Sociology, University of Illinois, Urbana from (1981-1983), assistant professor at the Graduate School of Criminal Justice, State University of New York at Albany (1977-1979) and director of the Criminal Justice Research Center in Albany, New York (1976-1979).

Self-control theory of crime
The theory was developed by Travis Hirschi and Gottfredson. The criminological theory proposes that lack of individual self-control is the main factor behind criminal behavior.

References

External links
 Michael Gottfredson announced as finalist for University of Oregon President

1951 births
Living people
American criminologists
Presidents of the University of Oregon
University of California, Davis alumni
University at Albany, SUNY alumni
University of California, Irvine people